Tigres de Ciego de Avila is a baseball team in the Cuban National Series. Based in Ciego de Ávila Province, the Tigres have spent most of its history in the bottom reaches of the standings.

However, in recent seasons, the team has turned their fortunes around, making it to the 2011 Series Nacional final (losing to Pinar del Rio in six games).  The following season, the Tigres bounded back to the finals again, this time winning their first ever Series Nacional over perennial favourites Industriales in six games. The Tigres have continued their run of form since, winning back-to-back championships in 2015 and 2016.

Ciego de Ávila placed two players, Roger Machado and Maikel Folch, on the Cuba national team for the 2006 World Baseball Classic.

In the 2013 World Baseball Classic, the Tigres had Vladimir Garcia, Yander Guevara and Rusney Castillo all playing on the Cuba National Team.

Roster

Notable former players
 Manuel Álvarez
 Ernesto Baró
 Ángel Castillo
 Rusney Castillo
 Yorelvis Charles
 Yozzen Cuesta 
 Yoelvis Fiss
 Maikel Folch
 Adonis García
 Vladimir Garcia
 Ivan González
 Roger Machado
 Julio Mantilla
 Isaac Martínez Dorta
 Alejo O'Reilly
 Roger Poll Soler
 Mario Vega

See also 
Team Website - Ciego de Ávila Tigers

References 

Baseball teams in Cuba
Ciego de Ávila